The Dender (Dutch) or Dendre (French) is a  long river in Belgium, the right tributary of the river Scheldt. The confluence of the two rivers is in the Belgian town of Dendermonde.

The two rivers meet in the town of Ath. From that confluence, the river is called the Dender proper. From Ath, the Dender passes into the Denderstreek through the cities and towns of Geraardsbergen, south of which its tributary, the Mark, flows into it. From this confluence, the river continues to flow through Ninove, Denderleeuw, and Aalst, before ending in Dendermonde. The Dender is navigable up to Aalst for small ships up to 600 tons and further upstream for ships up to 350 tons. The Molenbeek-Ter Erpenbeek flows into the Dender at Hofstade.

Gallery

References 

Rivers of Belgium
Rivers of East Flanders
Rivers of Hainaut (province)